Lejweleputswa (Sesotho word meaning "Grey rock" in English) is one of the 5 districts of Free State province of South Africa. The seat of Lejweleputswa is Welkom. The majority of its 657 019 people speak Sotho (2001 Census). The district code is DC18.

Neighbours

Lejweleputswa is surrounded by:
 Dr Kenneth Kaunda in North West to the north (DC40)
 Fezile Dabi to the north-east (DC20)
 Thabo Mofutsanyane to the south-east(DC19)
 Mangaung Metro to the south
 Xhariep to the south-west (DC16)
 Frances Baard in Northern Cape to the west(DC9)
 Dr Ruth Segomotsi Mompati in North West to the north-west(DC39)

Local municipalities

The district contains the following local municipalities:

Demographics
The following statistics are from the 2001 census.

Gender

Ethnic group

Age

Politics

Election results
Election results for Lejweleputswa in the South African general election, 2004. 
 Population 18 and over: 418 466 [63.69% of total population]
 Total votes: 234 060 [35.62% of total population]
 Voting % estimate: 55.93% votes as a % of population 18 and over

References

External links
 Lejweleputswa DM Official Website

 
District municipalities of the Free State (province)